A national personification is an anthropomorphic personification of a state or the people(s) it inhabits. It may appear in political cartoons and propaganda.

Some early personifications in the Western world tended to be national manifestations of the majestic wisdom and war goddess Minerva/Athena, and often took the Latin name of the ancient Roman province. Examples of this type include Britannia, Germania, Hibernia, Hispania, Helvetia and Polonia. Examples of personifications of the Goddess of Liberty include Marianne, the Statue of Liberty (Liberty Enlightening the World), and many examples of United States coinage. Another ancient model was Roma, a female deity who personified the city of Rome and more broadly, the Roman state, and who was revived in the 20th Century as the personification of Mussolini's "New Roman Empire". Examples of representations of the everyman or citizenry in addition to the nation itself are Deutscher Michel, John Bull and Uncle Sam.

Gallery

Personifications by country or territory

See also
 Afghanis-tan, a manga originally published as a webcomic about Central Asia with personified countries.
 Polandball, a contemporary form of national personification in which countries are drawn by Internet users as stereotypic balls and shared as comics on online communities.
 Hetalia: Axis Powers, an anime about personified countries interacting, mostly taking place within the World Wars.
 Mural crown
 National animal, often personifies a nation in cartoons.
 National emblem, for other metaphors for nations.
 National god, a deity that embodies a nation.
 National patron saint, a Saint that is regarded as the heavenly advocate of a nation.

References

Further reading
 Lionel Gossman. "Making of a Romantic Icon: The Religious Context of Friedrich Overbeck's 'Italia und Germania.'" American Philosophical Society, 2007. .

External links

 A scholarly case study of the evolution of Deutscher Michel
 Kirsten Stirling: "The Image of the Nation as a Woman in Twentieth Century Scottish Literature"

 
Visual arts genres
Liberty symbols